Natranaerobius is a halophilic and anaerobic genus of bacteria from the family of Natranaerobiaceae.

References 

Bacteria genera
Natranaerobiales
[[Category:Taxa described in 2007]